Rhesa Edward Smith (February 21, 1879 – March 20, 1956) was a pitcher in Major League Baseball who played for the St. Louis Browns in 1906.

External links

Major League Baseball pitchers
St. Louis Browns players
Baseball players from Indiana
1879 births
1956 deaths
Minor league baseball managers
Bloomington Blues players
Rock Island Islanders players
Dayton Veterans players
People from Mentone, Indiana